As Long as It Takes is the third studio album released by Christian singer Meredith Andrews.

Track listing
All songs were co-written by Andrews; additional writers are listed below.

Awards

The album won a Dove Award for Praise & Worship Album of the Year at the 42nd GMA Dove Awards, while the song "How Great Is the Love" also won for Worship Song of the Year.

References

2010 albums
Meredith Andrews albums